Wonder Peak is located on the border of Alberta and British Columbia in the Canadian Rockies. Situated on the Continental Divide, it also straddles the shared boundary of Banff National Park with Mount Assiniboine Provincial Park. It was named in 1913 by Arthur O. Wheeler and Conrad Kain.

Geology

Wonder Peak is composed of sedimentary rock laid down from the Precambrian to Jurassic periods. Formed in shallow seas, this sedimentary rock was pushed east and over the top of younger rock during the Laramide orogeny.

Climate

Based on the Köppen climate classification, Wonder Peak is located in a subarctic climate zone with cold, snowy winters, and mild summers. Temperatures can drop below -20°C with wind chill factors below -30°C.

See also
 List of peaks on the Alberta–British Columbia border
 List of mountains of Alberta
 Mountains of British Columbia

References

External links

 Wonder Peak photo: Flickr 

Two-thousanders of Alberta
Two-thousanders of British Columbia
Canadian Rockies